The Football League Second Division Manager of the Month award was a monthly prize of recognition given to association football managers in the Football League Second Division, the third tier of English football from 1992 to 2004. The award was announced in the first week of the following month. From the 2004–05 season onwards, following a rebranding exercise by The Football League, the third tier was known as Football League One, thus the award became the Football League One Manager of the Month award. The awards are designed and manufactured in the UK by bespoke awards company Gaudio Awards.

Winners

2000–01

2001–02

2002–03

2003–04

After 2004

References

External links
Manager of the Month at the League Managers Association
Bespoke Award Manufacturers

English Football League trophies and awards
Manager of the Month